2 is a compilation album of songs by the Spanish band Dover, released in 2007. It is a double CD greatest hits compilation from the band including singles "Serenade", "Devil Came to Me" and "Loli Jackson" and featuring many singles and favourites from their past albums.

The CD also includes a new single, "Soldier", and pop versions of five of their greatest hits and successes from their previous album Follow the City Lights.

Track listing

Personnel 
 Cristina Llanos – vocals, acoustic guitar
 Amparo Llanos – guitar
 Jesús Antúnez – drums
 Samuel Titos – bass guitar

Charts

References

External links 
 

2007 compilation albums
Dover (band) compilation albums
Capitol Records compilation albums
EMI Records compilation albums